Raclitia is a genus of snakes belonging to the family Homalopsidae.

Species
Species:
 Raclitia indica Gray, 1842

References

Homalopsidae
Snake genera